The North Dakota Board of Railroad Commissioners was a North Dakota constitutional agency that was the precedent of the North Dakota Public Service Commission. The Commission consisted of three elected Railroad Commissioners, and was created in 1889. In 1940, in response to the commission's expanding duties beyond the railroad industry, it was renamed the North Dakota Public Service Commission.

See also
List of North Dakota Public Service Commissioners
North Dakota Public Service Commission

Railroad Commission